Keith Miller (1919–2004) was an Australian Test cricketer and World War II pilot.

Keith Miller may also refer to:
Keith Miller (footballer, born 1921) (1921–1987), Australian rules footballer for Geelong and North Melbourne
Keith Harvey Miller (1925–2019), American politician
Keith Miller (footballer, born 1953), Australian rules footballer for Geelong and in the Australian Capital Territory
Keith Miller (infielder) (born 1963), American baseball player with the Mets and Royals
Keith Miller (outfielder) (born 1963), American baseball player with the Phillies
Keith Miller (writer) (1927–2012), author of Christian books
Keith Miller (journalist) (fl. 1970s–2000s), London-based journalist for NBC News
Keith B. Miller (fl. 2000s–2010s), geologist at Kansas State University
Keith Miller (EastEnders), a character on EastEnders

See also
Keith Millar (1906–1971), Australian sportsman